The 2013 Tostitos Fiesta Bowl was a postseason college football bowl game played on Thursday, January 3, 2013, at University of Phoenix Stadium in Glendale, Arizona. The Kansas State Wildcats, champions of the Big 12 Conference, played the Oregon Ducks, an at-large selection from the Pac-12 Conference. This was the only bowl game of the season to feature two top-10 ranked teams, other than the 2013 BCS National Championship Game.

The game started at 6:30 p.m. (MST) and aired on ESPN. Oregon won the game by a score of 35 points to 17 over Kansas State, making its second Fiesta Bowl title for the Ducks (first since 2001 in the 2002 Fiesta Bowl).

Preview
This was the first time Kansas State and Oregon played each other on the gridiron. The two teams were scheduled to meet during the 2012 regular season but the game was cancelled due to scheduling conflicts. On November 11, 2012, both schools were undefeated (10–0) and were ranked #1 or #2 in the polls and the BCS rankings. However, both schools lost their eleventh game of the season on November 17 to fall from the national championship race.  Each finished the regular season with an 11–1 record.

This was the fourth Fiesta Bowl to match a Big 12 (formerly Big Eight) team and a Pac-12 (formerly Pacific-10) team. The previous such Fiesta Bowls occurred in 1983 (Oklahoma vs. Arizona State), 2002 (Colorado, then representing the Big 12, against Oregon) and 2012 (Oklahoma State vs. Stanford).

Kansas State 

K-State attributed its success this season to a balanced offense led by quarterback Collin Klein and an opportunistic defense that included linebacker Arthur Brown. The Wildcats are leading the nation in turnover margin at +21. Klein rushed for 22 touchdowns this season, threw for 10 or more touchdowns in consecutive seasons, passed for more than 4,000 yards and rushed 2,000 yards for a career.

Oregon

The Oregon Ducks were led by redshirt freshman quarterback Marcus Mariota, who was the Conference’s Offensive Freshman of the Year. Mariota, was sixth in the country in passing efficiency, completed 218 of 312 passes for 2,511 yards and 30 touchdowns with six interceptions. All-America running back Kenjon Barner ran for 1,624 yards and scored 22 touchdowns this season, fifth best in rushing (135.3 avg.) and sixth in scoring (11.0 ppg).

Game summary

Scoring summary

Statistics

Conversion safety scored
A rare type of football scoring occurred during the third quarter on an attempted Oregon extra point, a one-point conversion safety. The one-point safety was awarded to Oregon after Kansas State blocked Oregon's extra-point attempt, recovered the ball in the field of play, then retreated into the end zone where the player with the ball was tackled.  This was only the second one-point safety scored in the history of NCAA FBS competition; the other was converted by Texas against Texas A&M on November 26, 2004.

References

External links
 1 point safety Oregon vs. Kansas State via YouTube

Fiesta Bowl
Fiesta Bowl
Fiesta Bowl
Kansas State Wildcats football bowl games
Oregon Ducks football bowl games
January 2013 sports events in the United States